Derbyshire County Cricket Club in 1971 was the centenary cricket season of the English club Derbyshire which had first played in 1871. In the County Championship, they won one match to finish seventeenth in their seventy-seventh season in the Championship. They won seven matches in the John Player League to finish eleventh. They were eliminated in Round 2 of the Gillette Cup.

1971 season

Derbyshire played 24 games in the County Championship, one match against Oxford University and one match against the touring Pakistanis. They won one match overall and managed 19 draws in the County Championship. Ian Buxton was in his second season as captain.  Ian Hall scored most runs and Philip Russell took most wickets.

Anthony Borrington and Ashley Harvey-Walker, who made their first-class debuts in the season, went on to play for several more seasons for Derbyshire. Harvey-Walker achieved a unique distinction by scoring a century in his debut match.  Another newcomer, David Wilde, played in this and the following season. Leslie Bradbury made his single first-class cricket appearance in one match for Derbyshire. Harold Cartwright, only played one-day cricket for Derbyshire in this his initial season, but stayed with the club for several seasons

Matches

First Class
{| class="wikitable" width="100%"
! bgcolor="#efefef" colspan=6 | List of matches
|- bgcolor="#efefef"
!No.
!Date
!V
!Result 
!Margin
!Notes
|-
|1
|1 May 1971
| Middlesex   County Ground, Derby 
|bgcolor="#FFCC00"|Drawn
| 
|    Parfitt 103; Latchman 6–72 
|- 
|2
| 5 May 1971
| Leicestershire Queen's Park, Chesterfield 
|bgcolor="#FFCC00"|Drawn
| 
|    Inman 147 
|- 
|3
|  8 May 1971
|  Gloucestershire  Ashley Down Ground, Bristol 
 |bgcolor="#FFCC00"|Drawn
| 
|     
|- 
|4
| 15 May 1971
| Warwickshire Edgbaston, Birmingham 
 |bgcolor="#FFCC00"|Drawn
| 
|    PJK Gibbs 127; Lance Gibbs 6–54 
|- 
|5
| 22 May 1971
| Yorkshire Queen's Park, Chesterfield 
 |bgcolor="#FFCC00"|Drawn
| 
|     
|- 
|6
| 26 May 1971
| SomersetCounty Ground, Derby 
 |bgcolor="#FFCC00"|Drawn
| 
|    CP Wilkins 113; A Jones 5–26 
|- 
|7
| 29 May 1971
| Essex   Ind Coope Ground, Burton-on-Trent 
|bgcolor="#FF0000"|Lost 
| Innings and 41 runs
|    Hobbs 5–38 
|- 
|8
| 5 Jun 1971
| Kent  Rectory Field, Blackheath 
|bgcolor="#00FF00"|Won 
| 93 runs
|    MH Page 111; FW Swarbrook 5–55 
|- 
|9
| 9 Jun 1971
 | Essex  Valentine's Park, Ilford  
 |bgcolor="#FFCC00"|Drawn
| 
|     
|- 
|10
| 16 Jun 1971
|  WorcestershireQueen's Park, Chesterfield 
 |bgcolor="#FFCC00"|Drawn
| 
|     
|- 
|11
| 19 Jun 1971
| Hampshire County Ground, Derby 
|bgcolor="#FFCC00"|Drawn
| 
|     
|- 
|12
 |23 Jun 1971
| |Oxford University    Ind Coope Ground, Burton-on-Trent 
 |bgcolor="#FF0000"|Lost 
| 2 wickets
|    AJ Harvey-Walker 110 
|- 
|13
|  26 Jun 1971
| Nottinghamshire  Trent Bridge, Nottingham 
 |bgcolor="#FFCC00"|Drawn
| 
|    Harris 114 
|- 
|14
| 3 Jul 1971
| Pakistanis  Queen's Park, Chesterfield 
 |bgcolor="#FF0000"|Lost 
| 8 wickets
|    Intikhab Alam 5–155; Pervez Saijad 6–71  
|- 
|15
| 7 Jul 1971
| Kent County Ground, Derby 
 |bgcolor="#FFCC00"|Drawn
| 
|    Steele 195; Balderstone 6–84 
|- 
|16
| 10 Jul 1971
| Leicestershire Grace Road, Leicester 
 |bgcolor="#FFCC00"|Drawn
| 
|     
|- 
|17
| 14 Jul 1971
| Yorkshire North Marine Road Ground, Scarborough 
 |bgcolor="#FFCC00"|Drawn
| 
|    Geoffrey Boycott 133 
|- 
|18
| 17 Jul 1971
| Lancashire  Park Road Ground, Buxton 
 |bgcolor="#FFCC00"|Drawn
| 
|    Engineer 141; Hughes 5–96 
|- 
|19
| 24 Jul 1971
| Hampshire May's Bounty, Basingstoke 
 |bgcolor="#FFCC00"|Drawn
| 
|     
|- 
|20
| 31 Jul 1971
| Nottinghamshire  Rutland Recreation Ground, Ilkeston 
 |bgcolor="#FFCC00"|Drawn
| 
|    White 7–41 
|- 
|21
| 7 Aug 1971
|  Sussex   County Ground, Hove 
 |bgcolor="#FFCC00"|Drawn
| 
|     
|- 
|22
| 14 Aug 1971
| Northamptonshire  County Ground, Northampton 
 |bgcolor="#FFCC00"|Drawn
| 
|    PJK Gibbs; E Smith 5–64; Breakwell 5–26 
|- 
|23
| 21 Aug 1971
|  Gloucestershire  Queen's Park, Chesterfield  
 |bgcolor="#FF0000"|Lost 
| 43 runs
|    Proctor 167; CP Wilkins 111; Mortimore 6–59 
|- 
|24
| 25 Aug 1971
| Lancashire  Old Trafford, Manchester 
 |bgcolor="#FF0000"|Lost 
| 4 wickets
|    CP Wilkins 156 
|- 
|25
| 28 Aug 1971
| Glamorgan   County Ground, Derby 
 |bgcolor="#FFCC00"|Drawn
| 
|     
|- 
|26
| 1 Sep 1971
|  Surrey Kennington Oval 
 |bgcolor="#FF0000"|Lost 
| 40 runs
|    Storey 164; Intikhab Alam 5–63 
|-

John Player League
{| class="wikitable" width="100%"
! bgcolor="#efefef" colspan=6 | List of matches
|- bgcolor="#efefef"
!No.
!Date
!V
!Result 
!Margin
!Notes
 |- 
|1
| 2 May 1971
| Yorkshire St George's Road, Harrogate 
|bgcolor="#00FF00"|Won 
| 1 wicket
|     
|- 
|2
| 9 May 1971
|  Gloucestershire  Ashley Down Ground, Bristol 
 |bgcolor="#FF0000"|Lost 
| 20 runs
|    CP Wilkins 5–42 
|- 
|3
|16 May 1971
| Somerset Rutland Recreation Ground, Ilkeston 
 |bgcolor="#FF0000"|Lost 
| 9 runs
|     
|- 
|4
|16 May 1971
| Essex   Park Road Ground, Buxton  
 |bgcolor="#FF0000"|Lost 
| 22 runs
|    Brian Taylor 100 
|- 
|5
|30 May 1971
| Nottinghamshire  Queen's Park, Chesterfield 
|bgcolor="#00FF00"|Won 
| 9 runs
|     
|- 
|6
|6 Jun 1971
| Leicestershire Grace Road, Leicester 
 |bgcolor="#FF0000"|Lost 
| Faster rate
|     
|- 
|7
|20 Jun 1971
| Lancashire  Old Trafford, Manchester 
 |bgcolor="#FF0000"|Lost 
| 6 wickets
|     
|- 
|8
|27 Jun 1971
| Kent County Ground, Derby 
|bgcolor="#00FF00"|Won 
| 2 runs
|     
|- 
|9
|4 Jul 1971
|  WorcestershireCounty Ground, New Road, Worcester 
 |bgcolor="#FF0000"|Lost 
| Faster rate
|     
|- 
|10
|11 Jul 1971
| Northamptonshire  Queen's Park, Chesterfield 
|bgcolor="#00FF00"|Won 
| 21 runs
|     
|- 
|11
|25 Jul 1971
| Hampshire County Ground, Southampton 
 |bgcolor="#FF0000"|Lost 
| 121 runs
|     
|- 
|12
|1 Aug 1971
| Warwickshire  County Ground, Derby 
|bgcolor="#FF0000"|Lost 
| 2 wickets
|     
|- 
|13
| 8 Aug 1971
|  Sussex   County Ground, Hove 
|bgcolor="#00FF00"|Won 
| 3 wickets
|     
|- 
|14
|15 Aug 1971
| Middlesex   County Ground, Derby 
|bgcolor="#00FF00"|Won 
| 3 runs
|     
|- 
|15
|29 Aug 1971
| Glamorgan   Queen's Park, Chesterfield 
 |bgcolor="#FFCC00"|No Result
| 
|     
|- 
|16
|5 Sep 1971
|  Surrey Kennington Oval 
|bgcolor="#00FF00"|Won 
| 24 runs
|     
|- 
|

Gillette Cup 
{| class="wikitable" width="100%"
! bgcolor="#efefef" colspan=6 | List of matches
|- bgcolor="#efefef"
!No.
!Date
!V
!Result 
!Margin
!Notes
 |- 
|1st Round
| 12 Jun 1971
| Leicestershire Grace Road, Leicester 
|bgcolor="#FF0000"|Lost 
| 1 wicket
|     
|-

Statistics

Competition batting averages

Competition bowling averages

Wicket Keeping
Bob Taylor
County Championship Catches 45, Stumping 8
John Player League Catches 5, Stumping 3
Gillette Cup Catches 1, Stumping 0

See also
Derbyshire County Cricket Club seasons
1971 English cricket season

References

1971 in English cricket
Derbyshire County Cricket Club seasons